Poverty Made Happy – Polish opera (operetta) in 2 acts by Maciej Kamieński. Libretto was written by Wojciech Bogusławski, based on a same-named cantata by Franciszek Bohomolec (1777). Its premiere took place on 11 July 1778 in Radziwiłł Palace in Warsaw.

For two centuries Nędza uszczęśliwiona was considered the first Polish opera performed in public theatre. In 2005 Jerzy Gołos published an anonymous comic opera (found in a manuscript held in Adam Mickiewicz University in Poznań), which he named Heca albo polowanie na zająca. It dates ca.1680. There were also two operas by Michał Kazimierz Ogiński staged before Nędza uszczęśliwiona (in Słonim, 1771): Opuszczone dzieci and Filozof zmieniony.

Roles 
 Podstarości – baryton
 Anna, poor peasant – soprano
 Kasia, her daughter – soprano
 Jan, wealthy burgher – bass
 Antek, farm worker – tenor

The scene is staged in a noble village.

Editions 
 Maciej Kamieński, Wojciech Bogusławski. Nędza uszczęśliwiona: Opera w dwóch aktach. Libretto Wojciecha Bogusławskiego według Franciszka Bohomolca. Kraków: PWM, 140 pp.

Bibliography 
 Barbara Chmara-Żaczkiewicz. Kamieński [Kamięski, Kamenický, Kamenský], Maciej / New Grove Dictionary of Music and Musicians

External links 
 
 Complete libretto (in Polish)

1778 operas
Polish-language operas